Calloodes grayianus, the golden bordered beetle, is a species of shining leaf chafers of the family Scarabaeidae.

Description
It is the largest species of the genus Calloodes and it is a structurally coloured species creating a green body appearance, with yellow margins. It shows complex eyes and a horny protrusion in the front head.

Distribution
This species can be found in the rainforest of Australia.

Etymology
The name honours John Edward Gray.

References
 Biolib
 Andrew B. T. Smith  Checklist of the world Anoplognathini
 A review of the Australian rutelinae (Coleoptera: Scarabaedae) 

Rutelinae